Nawabganj Bird Sanctuary, renamed in 2015 Shahid Chandra Shekhar Azad Bird Sanctuary, is a bird sanctuary located in Unnao district on the Kanpur-Lucknow highway in Uttar Pradesh, India consisting of a lake and the surrounding environment. It is one of the many wetlands of Northern India. The sanctuary provides protection for 250 species of migratory birds mostly from CIS (or formerly USSR) countries, but the numbers have been dwindling since the 1990s, most having relocated to newer areas in Himachal and Rajasthan. The sanctuary also houses a deer park, watchtowers and boats.

Birds
The avian population here comprises a mix of residents as well as migratory birds. The birds migrate across Himalayas from Tibet, China, Europe and Siberia during winters. Some of these birds fly over 5000 km and above 8500 meters high to reach here. Some of the major migratory birds during the season are greylag goose, pintail, cotton teal, red-crested pochard, gadwall, shoveller, coot and mallard. Some major local migratory and residential birds are sarus crane, painted stork, peafowl, white ibis, dabchick, whistling teal, open-bill stork, white-necked stork, pheasant-tailed jacana, bronze winged jacana, purple moorhen, lapwing, tern, vulture, pigeon, king crow, Indian roller and bee-eater.

Reptiles
The major reptiles found in the sanctuary are cobra, viper, krait, ratsnake and water snakes.

Cobra is the common name of various elapid snakes, most of which belonging to the genus Naja.

The Viperidae (vipers) are a family of venomous snakes found in most parts of the world, with the exception of Antarctica, Australia, Hawaii, Madagascar, New Zealand, various other isolated islands, and north of the Arctic Circle.

The common krait (Bungarus caeruleus), also known as Indian krait or blue krait) is a species of venomous snake of the genus Bungarus found in the jungles of the Indian subcontinent. It is a member of the "big four" species, inflicting the most snakebites on humans in India.

Rat snakes (or ratsnakes) are members – along with kingsnakes, milk snakes, vine snakes and indigo snakes – of the subfamily Colubrinae of the family Colubridae. They are medium to large constrictors and are found throughout much of the Northern Hemisphere. They feed primarily on rodents and birds.

Different snakes are called water snakes. "Water snake" is also sometimes used as a descriptive term for any snakes that spend a significant time in or near fresh water, such as any species belonging to the family Acrochordidae. They should not be confused with sea snakes, which live primarily or entirely in marine environments.

Deer park
A small park for deer has been established in the vicinity of the sanctuary. There are spotted and barking deers in the park. It is one of the main attractions in the sanctuary.

Hospitality
A guesthouse with bedding and lodging is provided inside the sanctuary along with a restaurant and a children park.

Image gallery

See also
Wildlife refuge
Nature reserve

References

External links

 Information on National Parks
 Nawabganj birds

Bird sanctuaries of Uttar Pradesh
Ramsar sites in India
Unnao district
Protected areas established in 2019
2019 establishments in Uttar Pradesh